Ethiopia's participation in the Paralympic Games has been sporadic. The country made its Paralympic début at the 1968 Summer Games in Tel Aviv, sending two competitors who both competed in both athletics and table tennis. Ethiopia was then absent from the Games for almost a decade, returning in 1976 with a one-man delegation Abraham Habte, who entered athletics, lawn bowls and table tennis. In 1980, Habte was again Ethiopia's only representative, this time competing only in lawn bowls. Ethiopia then entered a prolonged period of absence, before sending a single runner (Kiros Tekle) to the 2004 Games. In 2008, the country entered a two-man delegation in athletics. In 2012, Wondiye Fikre Indelbu became the first Ethiopian to win a medal in the Paralympic Games, winning a silver in the men's 1500 meters - T46 event in athletics.

On 28 August 2021, Tigist Mengistu won Ethiopia's first ever gold medal at the Paralympics when she won the women's 1500m T13 final.

Ethiopia has never participated in the Winter Paralympics.

Historical Medal Table

Medals by Summer Games

Medals by Winter Games

Medals

See also
 Ethiopia at the Olympics

References